École Secondaire Beaumont Composite High School, also known as ESBCHS is a junior senior high school with grades 10 through 12 in Beaumont, Alberta, Canada. Being a bilingual school, all grades are taught in either French or English. Built in the late 1980s, the school has an atrium; the peaks of its roof can be seen from all around the small town. Situated in the south west quadrant of Beaumont, it is the only high school in the town with enrollment of approximately 980 students. The school offers a variety of CTS courses with fully furnished labs including an Automotives, Fabrication, Foods, Photography, Cosmetology and an Outdoor Ed labs and classrooms. The school also is equipped with 6 computer labs and a library. The school has a background of athletic teams which include Volleyball, Basketball, Badminton, Track, Football, Golf, Rugby, as well as many others. The school also has a Fine Arts program including Art, Music, and Drama, which often wins regional Drama Festivals.

References

Beaumont Composite High School, Ecole Secondaire
Beaumont Composite High School, Ecole Secondaire
Beaumont Composite High School, Ecole Secondaire
Educational institutions established in 1988
1988 establishments in Alberta